Ranunculus nivalis, the snow buttercup, is a species of plant in the family Ranunculaceae. It grows in wet alpine meadows, cliffs and streamsides. It displays prevalent heliotropism, thus gaining an advantage in its harsh, cold environment through capturing more solar energy by following the sun.

References

nivalis
Flora of the Arctic
Flora of Northern Canada
Flora of Greenland
Flora of Norway
Plants described in 1753
Taxa named by Carl Linnaeus